Isla Piojo, or Lice Island, is an island in the Gulf of California, located within Bahía de los Ángeles east of the Baja California Peninsula. The island is uninhabited and is part of the Ensenada Municipality.

Biology

Isla Piojo has four species of reptiles: Crotalus mitchellii (speckled rattlesnake), Phyllodactylus nocticolus (peninsular leaf-toed gecko), Sauromalus hispidus (spiny chuckwalla), and Uta stansburiana (common side-blotched lizard).

References

http://herpatlas.sdnhm.org/places/overview/isla-piojo/125/1/

Islands of Ensenada Municipality
Islands of Baja California
Islands of the Gulf of California
Uninhabited islands of Mexico